Samuela Kautoga is a Fijian footballer who lives in New Zealand and plays as a defender for Manukau United.

Career statistics 

Scores and results list Fiji's goal tally first, score column indicates score after each Kautoga goal.

Honours 
 2017 Fiji Football Association Cup Tournament Player of the Tournament

References 

Living people
1987 births
I-Taukei Fijian people
Fijian footballers
Association football defenders
Fiji international footballers
Labasa F.C. players
Hekari United players
Lautoka F.C. players
Ba F.C. players
Amicale F.C. players
2008 OFC Nations Cup players
2012 OFC Nations Cup players
2016 OFC Nations Cup players
Fijian expatriate sportspeople in New Zealand
Expatriate association footballers in New Zealand
Fijian expatriate sportspeople in Papua New Guinea
Expatriate footballers in Papua New Guinea
Fijian expatriate sportspeople in Vanuatu
Expatriate footballers in Vanuatu